The men's association football tournament at the 2007 Indian Ocean Island Games (French: Jeux des îles de l'océan Indien 2007) held in Madagascar at Mahamasina Stadium in Antananarivo.

Group stage

Group A

Group B

Knockout stage

Semi-final

Third place match

Final

Top scorers

Final ranking

Per statistical convention in football, matches decided in extra time are counted as wins and losses, while matches decided by penalty shoot-out are counted as draws.

See also
Indian Ocean Island Games
Football at the Indian Ocean Island Games

References
rsssf.com 

2007
Indian Ocean Games 2007
Indian Ocean Games, 2007